Carolinochelys is an extinct genus of sea turtle from Oligocene of United States. It contains one species: C. wilsoni, and was first named by O.P. Hay in 1923.

References

Life History: Geologic History of Sea Turtles
zipcodezoo.com
Carolinochelys at the Paleobiology Database

Cheloniidae
Oligocene turtles
Fossil taxa described in 1923
Extinct animals of the United States
Prehistoric turtle genera
Extinct turtles
Monotypic prehistoric reptile genera